The ileal veins are tributaries of the superior mesenteric vein.

External links

Veins of the torso